Gillenia trifoliata, common name Bowman's root or Indian physic, is a species of flowering plant in the family Rosaceae, native to eastern North America from Ontario to Georgia.

In cultivation, this plant has gained the Royal Horticultural Society's Award of Garden Merit.

The root was dried and powdered by Native Americans and used as both a laxative and emetic.

References

External links
Plants for a Future database: Gillenia trifoliata

trifoliata
Flora of the Northeastern United States
Flora of the Southeastern United States
Flora of the North-Central United States
Flora of Ontario
Flora without expected TNC conservation status